Helen Mirra is an American conceptual artist. "[Like Henry David Thoreau, she is a] maximalist in a minimalist robe", with an idiosyncratic practice. She is engaged with ideas common to buddhist and pragmatist philosophies, and since 2008 her art practice has been integrated with walking. She has said of walking: "It is an unskilled activity, and a modest activity, and a free activity, and an always-available activity, and an equipment-free activity, and an active activity." In an essay on Mirra's work, Yukio Lippit described her engagement thus: "Mirra’s practice champions walking as a specific form of thinking that bypasses language. Indeed, one senses that she shares with Zen Buddhists in particular a deep skepticism towards language as an authentic mechanism of discovery." At the same time, she has often worked with language as a primary material.

Career
Helen Mirra has worked in diverse media including weaving, writing - particularly indexes, experimental music, sculpture, 16mm film, and video.  "Environmental belonging" has been a persistent theme, while keeping within a restricted palette. Her first solo gallery exhibition was in Chicago in 1999 and included a 16mm silent film, textile works, and the vinyl record Along, Below, all relating to geography, and her first one-person institutional exhibition, Sky-wreck, at the Renaissance Society at the University of Chicago in 2001, was a indigo-dyed textile sculpture of a section of the sky, imagined as part of a geodesic structure.  In addition to John Cage, Stanley Brouwn, André Cadere, and Douglas Huebler are key influences.

She has an extensive exhibition history in North and South America, Europe, and Japan, and participated in broad international exhibitions such as the 11th Havana Bienal, the 30th São Paulo Art Biennial and the 50th Venice Biennial. A fifteen-year (1995-2009) survey of her work, Edge Habitat , was presented in 2014 at Culturgest in Lisbon, Portugal, and the corresponding publication Edge Habitat Materials was published by WhiteWalls.

She was a Senior Lecturer in Visual Art and Cinema & Media Studies at the University of Chicago (2001-2005) and a Loeb Associate Professor of the Humanities in the department of Visual and Environmental Studies at Harvard University until 2013. She has been an artist-in-residence at University of California at Berkeley, and a guest of the DAAD Artists-in-Berlin Program.  She lives in Northern California.

Selected solo exhibitions
Sky-wreck, Renaissance Society, 2001
Declining Interval Lands, Whitney Museum of American Art, 2002
65 Instants , MATRIX 209, Berkeley Art Museum, 2003
Gehend, Bonner Kunstverein, KW Institute of Contemporary Art Berlin, and Haus Kontruktiv, Zurich, 2011-2012
Hourly Directional with Ernst Karel, MIT List Center, 2014
Hourly Directional , Radcliffe Institute for Advanced Study, 2014
Edge Habitat, Culturgest, Lisbon Portugal, 2014
Waulked,  Peter Freeman Inc., New York, 2014
Helen Mirra, Galerie Nordenhake, Stockholm, 2015
 *, Galerie Nordenhake, Stockholm, 2018
la malplena ĉambro estas bela, Large Glass, London, 2020

References

External links
artist's website

1970 births
American conceptual artists
Walking artists
Bennington College alumni
University of Illinois Chicago alumni
Harvard University faculty
University of Chicago faculty
MacDowell Colony fellows
Living people
Women conceptual artists
21st-century American women artists
American women academics